Jaschek is a German language  surname of Slavic origin (cf. Jašek) derived from a pet form of the personal name Jach, or directly from Jan. Notable people with the name include:

 Carlos Jaschek (1926–1999), German-born Argentine astrophysicist
 Willi Jaschek (born 1940), German gymnast

References 

German-language surnames
Surnames from given names